Z19 Hermann Künne was one of six Type 1936 destroyers built for the Kriegsmarine (German Navy) in the late 1930s. Completed at the beginning of 1939, the ship spent most of her time training although she did participate in the occupation of Memel a few months later. At the beginning of World War II in September, she was initially deployed to lay minefields off the German coast, but was soon transferred to the Skagerrak where she inspected neutral shipping for contraband goods. In late 1939, Z18 Hans Lüdemann helped to laid four offensive minefields off the English coast that claimed two British destroyers and thirty-eight merchant ships.

During the German invasion of Norway in April 1940, she was tasked to attack Narvik and participated in both the First and Second Naval Battles of Narvik. Z19 Hermann Künne was disabled during the first battle, but was repaired in time to fight in the second battle until she had exhausted her ammunition. Afterwards the ship had to be scuttled to prevent her capture.

Design and description
Her crew consisted of 10 officers and 313 sailors.

The ship carried five  SK C/34 guns in single mounts with gun shields, two each superimposed, fore and aft of the superstructure. The fifth mount was positioned on top of the rear deckhouse. The guns were numbered from 1 to 5 from front to rear. Her anti-aircraft armament consisted of four  SK C/30 guns in two twin mounts abreast the rear funnel and six  C/30 guns in single mounts. The ship carried eight above-water  torpedo tubes in two power-operated mounts. Two reloads were provided for each mount. She had four depth charge launchers and mine rails could be fitted on the rear deck that had a maximum capacity of 60 mines. 'GHG' (Gruppenhorchgerät) passive hydrophones were fitted to detect submarines and an active sonar system was installed by the end of 1939.

Construction and career
Z19 Hermann Künne was named after a gunner aboard the torpedo boat  was killed in hand-to-hand combat during the Zeebrugge Raid on 23 April 1918. The ship was ordered from AG Weser (Deschimag) on 6 January 1936. She was laid down at Deschimag's Bremen shipyard as yard number W921 on 5 October, launched on 22 December 1937, and commissioned on 12 January 1939. From 23 to 24 March, the ship was one of the destroyers that escorted Adolf Hitler aboard the heavy cruiser  to occupy Memel. On 30 June, Z19 Hermann Künne and her sister  were making port visits in Norway when the former accidentally rammed the pier at Moldefjord after her rudder failed. She returned to Swinemünde on 20 July and participated in torpedo training the following month.

When World War II began in September, Z19 Hermann Künne was initially deployed in the German Bight where she laid defensive minefields. The ship then patrolled the Skagerrak to inspect neutral shipping for contraband goods. The British were unaware of the minefield's existence and lost seven ships totaling . Missions on the nights of 8/9 and 10/11 November had to be aborted because of seawater contamination in Z19 Hermann Künnes fuel. On the night of 12/13 November Z21 Wilhelm Heidkamp, now the flagship of the Commander of Destroyers (Führer der Zerstörer), Kapitän zur See (Captain) Friedrich Bonte, escorted Z18 Hans Lüdemann, Z19 Hermann Künne, and Z20 Karl Galster as they laid 288 magnetic mines in the Thames estuary. Once again unaware of the minefield's existence, the British lost the destroyer  and thirteen merchant ships of 48,728 GRT.

Less than a week later, Z21 Wilhelm Heidkamp, Z19 Hermann Künne, and  laid 180 magnetic mines in the Thames Estuary on the night of 17/18 November. The mines sank the destroyer , a fishing trawler, and seven ships of 27,565 GRT. On the night of 12/13 December, German destroyers sortied to lay minefields off the British coast. Under the command of Commodore (Kommodore) Bonte in his flagship Z19 Hermann Künne, Z8 Bruno Heinemann, Z14 Friedrich Ihn and Z15 Erich Steinbrinck laid 240 mines off the mouth of the River Tyne, where the navigation lights were still lit. The British lost eleven ships totaling 18,979 GRT. Z19 Hermann Künne was scheduled for another minelaying mission on 17 December, but boiler contamination prevented her participation and she was refitting in Stettin until 14 March 1940

Norwegian Campaign

Z19 Hermann Künne was allocated to Group 1 for the Norwegian portion of Operation Weserübung in April 1940. The group's task was to transport the 139th Mountain Infantry Regiment (139. Gebirgsjäger Regiment) and the headquarters of the 3rd Mountain Division (3. Gebirgs-Division) to seize Narvik. The ships began loading troops on 6 April and set sail the next day. When they arrived off the Ofotfjord on the morning of 9 April, Z19 Hermann Künne landed her troops at the head of the Herjangsfjord and helped to capture the Norwegian Army barracks at Elvegårdsmoen. Later that day she briefly refuelled from the whale factory ship  and then stood picket duty until midnight when she returned to Jan Wellem to top off her fuel tanks.

Shortly after dawn on 10 April, the ship was still tied up to Jan Wellem when the five destroyers of the British 2nd Destroyer Flotilla, Hardy, Havock, Hunter, Hotspur, and Hero appeared. Hardy, Hunter and Havock made the first attack on Narvik harbor while the other two acted as rearguards. Z19 Hermann Künne exchanged fire with Hunter to no effect while preparing to back away from the whaler. By the time Havock opened fire, the German ship was underway, having cast off hoses and mooring lines. Without power, the ship drifted into the wreck and became entangled with it. Some of her crew panicked and jumped overboard, but only a few were rescued. After about an hour, she was able to restore power and disentangle herself from Z22 Anton Schmitts wreck. Z19 Hermann Künne had suffered from splinter damage that killed nine crewmen. Later that afternoon she sailed to the wreck of Hardy where it had run aground and searched it.

On the night of 12/13 April, Commander (Fregattenkapitän) Erich Bey, the senior surviving German officer, received word to expect an attack the following day by British capital ships escorted by a large number of destroyers and supported by carrier aircraft. The battleship  and nine destroyers duly appeared on 13 April, although earlier than Bey had expected, and caught the Germans out of position. Z19 Hermann Künne, leading  westwards to take up her position flanking the entrance to the fjord, was the first ship to spot the approaching British ships and alerted Bey. The other operable destroyers joined Z19 Hermann Künne as she fell back and engaged the British ships at long range from behind a smoke screen. Nine Fairey Swordfish torpedo bombers attacked the German destroyers, near-missing Z19 Hermann Künne and another ship, but lost two aircraft shot down during the attack. By the early afternoon, the Germans had exhausted most of their ammunition and Bey ordered his ships to retreat to the Rombaksfjorden (the easternmost branch of the Ofotfjord), east of Narvik, where they might attempt to ambush any pursuing British destroyers. Lieutenant Commander (Korvettenkapitän) Friedrich Kothe, captain of the ship, misunderstood the signal and headed north into the Herjangsfjord where he run the ship aground in Trollvika near Bjerkvik. She had fired off all of her ammunition, including practice and star shells; her depth charges were rigged for demolition and they were set off once the crew had abandoned ship. The destroyers  and  followed the German ship into the Herjangsfjord and the former put a torpedo into the wreck for good measure, breaking off her stern.

The wreck

The ship was partially scrapped and the remains further demolished after World War II. In a 1999 survey, the wreck was found to contain no remaining oil. The wreck location is relatively easy to access, and wreck diving is permitted.

Notes

References

External links

 Kriegsmarine destroyers

1937 ships
Ships built in Bremen (state)
Type 1936 destroyers
Maritime incidents in April 1940
World War II shipwrecks in the Norwegian Sea
Scuttled vessels of Germany
Wreck diving sites
Underwater diving sites in Norway